Walter Erlebacher ( – ) was a sculptor. He was professor of sculpture and human anatomy at the University of the Arts in Philadelphia and a consultant and lecturer at the New York Academy of Art.

Works

His public works of art include the bronze sculpture Jesus Breaking Bread, commissioned in 1976 for the Eucharistic Congress and located on the grounds of Cathedral Basilica of Saints Peters and Paul in Philadelphia, and two life size figures for the Dream Garden in the lobby of the ARA Tower.

References

External links 
www.aaa.si.edu

Artists from Frankfurt
German sculptors
German male sculptors
1933 births
1991 deaths
University of the Arts (Philadelphia) faculty
Pratt Institute alumni